The South Dade Rail Trail (SDRT) is a rail trail, run by Miami-Dade County Parks and Recreation, that follows the old Florida East Coast Railway rail corridor for 20.5 miles, from Miami to Homestead in South Florida, traversing a diversity of urban, suburban and semi-rural environments.

Trail enthusiasts can enjoy walking, jogging, bicycling, inline skating and other non-motorized recreational uses from dawn to dusk, year round. There are several local businesses, parks, and neighborhoods throughout the entirety of the trail. One can experience paved roads from start to finish through urban neighborhoods to more swap like areas. Palm trees line parts of the trail's southern end.

This trail forms a section of the East Coast Greenway, a 3000-mile system of trails connecting Maine to Florida.

Historical development 

Historical significance

This trail rides along the right-of-way of the former Florida East Coast Railway, which connected major cities down the east coast of Florida. Built primarily in the last quarter of the 19th century and the first decade of the 20th century, the railroad was a project of Standard Oil principal Henry Morrison Flagler. Flagler then began the Florida East Coast Railway (FEC). Service on the railway stretched down the east coast of Florida passing through several cities including St. Augustine, Florida and Ft. Lauderdale, Florida.

Trail’s history and evolution

Paralleling US Highway 1 for most of its length, the route was adapted for—and is largely used by—urban commuters seeking refuge from Miami's heavy traffic congestion. The trail connects such points of interest such as the Dadeland and Cutler Ridge shopping areas and commercial office spaces.

Trail development 

Design and construction

The entire trail is made of asphalt road, with more than enough room for side-by-side riding. Cyclists can stretch their legs on this fairly open trail, but must assert caution when crossing its many major intersections due to typical busy traffic through Miami-Dade County areas. This trail is handicapped accessible but may not be as practical due to the traffic intersections.

Trail amenities

Ample parking is located throughout the majority of the trail, allowing individuals to jump on the trail at several locations. There are over 50 bus stops and 6 Metrorail stations throughout the course of the trail, which gives the option for trail goers to stop and ride the bus back at any point. Restrooms are located at all three trailheads and also sporadically throughout the trail from local businesses. Access to the trail can be granted at most areas that the trail rides through.

Community 

Trail supporters
The SDRT is managed and maintained by the Miami-Dade County Parks and Recreations department. Funded mainly by the state, the SDRT is constantly kept by the county with frequent clean ups and new innovative areas for improvement.

Special events

See also
Transportation in South Florida
The Underline

References

External links 
 
 
 

Rail trails in Florida
Bike paths in Florida
Parks in Miami-Dade County, Florida